Apocephalus is a genus of ant-decapitating flies (insects in the family Phoridae). There are at least 300 described species in Apocephalus.

See also
 List of Apocephalus species

References

Further reading

External links

 

Phoridae
Articles created by Qbugbot
Platypezoidea genera